Kuleh Nab (also Romanized as Kūleh Nāb; also known as Guleh Nav (Persian: گوله ناو), also Romanized as Gūleh Nāv) is a village in Itivand-e Jonubi Rural District, Kakavand District, Delfan County, Lorestan Province, Iran. At the 2006 census, its population was 106, in 15 families.

References 

Towns and villages in Delfan County